The term Specola in Italian means observatory, a location used for observing terrestrial or celestial events. A number of palaces, institutes, museums and observatories in Italy carry the name, because at one time or another they housed an observatory. Among these:

La Specola - Natural history museum in Florence, Italy
Palazzotto Specola in Pisa, now Domus Galileana
Villa Specola di Lucca near Lucca, Tuscany
Museo della Specola, Bologna
Specola Vaticana (Vatican Observatory)
La Specola, Padua - astronomical observatory in Padua